M. M. Ismail (8 February 1921 – 17 January 2005) was an Indian politician who served as the acting Governor of Tamil Nadu and a Chief Justice of the Madras High Court.

Early life
Ismail was born in Nagore, Tamil Nadu on 8 February 1921. He studied at the Madras Law College in 1945, after completing his mathematics (honours) degree from the Presidency College, Chennai.

Work life
He was appointed an additional judge at the Delhi High Court in February 1967 and was transferred to the Madras High Court in November 1967. He became Chief Justice of the court on 6 November 1979. On 8 July 1981 he tendered his resignation, following his transfer to the Kerala High Court as its Chief Justice.

On 27 October 1980, Ismail was sworn-in as the acting Governor of Tamil Nadu in the place of Prabhudas Patwari.

Legacy
Ismail was a learned Tamil scholar of Kamba Ramayana. As the president of the Kamban Kazhagam, he was responsible for organising literary festivals focussing on classical Tamil literature.

References

Governors of Tamil Nadu
Presidency College, Chennai alumni
1921 births
2005 deaths
Indian Muslims
Chief Justices of the Madras High Court
20th-century Indian judges
Judges of the Delhi High Court